Tempoal (formally: Tempoal de Sánchez) is a city in the Mexican state of Veracruz. Located in the state's Huasteca Alta region, 
it serves as the municipal seat of the surrounding Tempoal Municipality.

In the 2005 INEGI Census, the city of Tempoal reported a total population of 12,237.

Name
Tempoal comes from the Wastek Tam-puhal, meaning "place of toads". "De Sánchez" honours Rafael Platón Sánchez (1831–1867), a native of the area who fought in the Battle of Puebla of 5 May 1862 and later chaired the court martial that sentenced Emperor Maximilian and his generals Miguel Miramón and Tomás Mejía to death by firing squad in Santiago de Querétaro on 19 June 1867.

History
Tempoal was founded in pre-Hispanic times. 
It was given town  (villa)  status on 27 May 1927 and city (ciudad) status on 29 November 1927.

References

External links

Tempoal Web page of the Veracruz State Govt. Retrieved 6 November 2008.

Populated places in Veracruz